Arbela may refer to:

Places 
 Greco-Roman name of the city of Erbil, Kurdistan Region, Iraq
 Arbel, Israel
 Irbid, Jordan
 Arbela, Ohio, United States
 Arbela Township, Michigan, United States
 Arbela, Missouri, United States

Other uses 
 Arbela (bug), a genus of insect
 Battle of Arbela, fought in 331 BC near modern Erbil, Iraq
 Chronicle of Arbela, a religious text

See also

Arabela (disambiguation)